Ghost Gunner is an American desktop CNC mill and manufacturing concern in Austin, Texas. It was launched in October 2014 by Cody Wilson and the founders of Defense Distributed.

History 
Ghost Gunner began as a limited series of CNC mills produced by Defense Distributed in a crowdfunding sale to its mailing list in October 2014. Spring 2015 shipments sold out immediately, and its first media reviewer noted the machine "worked so well that it may signal a new era in the gun control debate, one where the barrier to legally building an untraceable, durable, and deadly semiautomatic rifle has reached an unprecedented low point in cost and skill."

Products 
Since 2014, Ghost Gunner has issued 3 generations of its CNC mill, with the latest being the Ghost Gunner 3. The second version, aptly named Ghost Gunner 2, is open-source hardware, allowing third party manufacturers to sell their own versions.
, Ghost Gunner had sold over 6,000 units worldwide. The most recent version of the Ghost Gunner accepts "Zero Percent Receivers," blocks of aluminum that are milled into a partial lower receiver of an AR-15 style rifle. These are in contrast to the 80 percent receivers first released with the Ghost Gunner.

Political controversy 
Ghost Gunner is cited by politicians and the media as the most popular machine tool used to produce ghost guns.

References 

Numerical control